Brookmerland is a Samtgemeinde ("collective municipality") in the district of Aurich, in Lower Saxony, Germany. It is situated southeast of Norden. Its seat is in the village Marienhafe.

The Samtgemeinde Brookmerland consists of the following municipalities:

 Leezdorf
 Marienhafe
 Osteel
 Rechtsupweg
 Upgant-Schott
 Wirdum

Samtgemeinden in Lower Saxony
Towns and villages in East Frisia